Kaljulaid is an Estonian surname with the literal meaning of "cliff islet" (compound noun of  "cliff", "rock") and  ("islet", "holm").
 
Notable people with the surname include:
 Kersti Kaljulaid (born 1969), Estonian politician
 Raimond Kaljulaid (born 1982), Estonian politician

References 

Estonian-language surnames